Notion or Notions may refer to:

Software 
 Notion (music software), a music composition and performance program
 Notion (productivity software), a note-taking and project-management program from Notion Labs Inc.
 Notion (window manager), the successor to the Ion window manager

Music 
 Notion (EP), by Tash Sultana, 2016
 "Notion" (Kings of Leon song), 2008
 Notion (magazine), a UK music and fashion quarterly
 Notion (music software), a music composition and performance program
 "Notion" (Tash Sultana song), 2016
 "Notion" (The Rare Occasions song), 2016

Other uses 
 Johnnie Notions, Shetland smallpox inoculator
 Notion (ancient city), a Greek city-state on the west coast of Anatolia
 Notion, ancient name of Mizen Head in Ireland
 Notion (philosophy), a reflection in the mind of real objects and phenomena in their essential features and relations
 Notions (sewing), small articles used in sewing and haberdashery
 Notions (Winchester College), the Winchester slang